Ella Boyce Kirk (c.1861 – 1930) was the first woman to become Superintendent of Schools in a Pennsylvania city, and possibly the first in the United States.

She was born in Bangor, Maine ca. 1861, and taught school in Bradford, Pennsylvania before moving to Pittsburgh. In 1890, she married a wealthy oil man named David Kirk (businessman).  She authored My Pilgrimage to Coue (1922).

References

1930 deaths
People from Bangor, Maine
Year of birth uncertain